Baldassarre Bonaiuti,  also known as Marchionne di Coppo Stefani (1336, in Florence – 1385, in Florence), was a chronicler (historian), statesman, politician, businessman and diplomat from Florence, Italy.

Biography 
Bonaiuti was born in Florence in early 1336 into a wealthy ruling-class family, probably of bankers. His given birth name was Baldassarre, but he preferred to be called Melchioni or Marchionne or Marconne. "Marchionne di Coppo Stefani", the pseudonym under which he is best known, derives from a mistake by the first publisher of his literary work, Father Ildefonso di San Luigi, considering "Stefani" erroneously as a family name. It is not known why he preferred to be called Melchioni or Melchionni or Marconne, perhaps with some allusion to the legendary names of the Magi of the Gospel; however this is pure speculation, as it does not seem appropriate to his social status.

Bonaiuti was the son of Coppo Stefani de Buonaiuti, a wealthy banker and businessman, and his second wife Gemma di Dante di Rinaldo. Bonaiuti's father was several times elected a captain of the  charitable society of Orsanmichele. Bonaiuti lost both his parents when he was fifteen years old. He grew up with his sister and his step-brothers and step-sisters from his father's first marriage, who lived together in a house his father had bought in 1318. Bonaiuti married Costanza di Guido degli Adimari, and if they had children, city archives show none survived to adulthood. Local Florentine city documents show he was a moderately wealthy landowner of a house in the city and a farm in the country.

Bonaiuti had a political career starting from about 1366, because he was an expert in financial matters. He made an extended business trip through Italy in 1367 and was in Naples that year. There, he made a report to the government of Florence on the relationship of the city with the House of Valois-Anjou. From Naples he accompanied Joan I of Naples on a visit to Rome for an audience with Pope Urban V. He was most politically active in the 1370s. His father was previously associated with the political world. Bonaiuti himself was associated with various Florentine guilds of the popular movement. Because of his political connections, he was chosen to go on various diplomatic missions to represent the Florentine joint executive committee and liaised with the holders of major political offices. In 1376 he was his city's ambassador in Bologna during the War of the Eight Saints and was also on various other diplomatic missions in 1379, 1380, and 1381. In 1381 he was sent as ambassador to the German King, Wenceslaus, on what was considered an important diplomatic mission. In 1382 he represented the government of Florence that put an end to the Revolt of the Ciompi.

Literary work 

Bonaiuti's Cronaca fiorentina ("Florentine Chronicle") is his only known literary work and includes his first-hand account of the Black Death in and around Florence in the mid-14th century, as well as a history of the city from its earliest times. Bonaiuti did this work as a labor of love during his retirement, in the late 1370s and early 1380s, which proved to be his final years.

References

Sources 
 Avery, Catherine B., The New Century Italian Renaissance encyclopedia, Appleton-Century-Crofts, 1972
 Ragone, Franca, Giovanni Villani e i suoi continuatori: La scrittura delle cronache a Firenze nel Trecento ('Giovanni Villani and those who came after him: the writing of chronicles in fourteenth-century Florence'), Rome, 1998

1336 births
1385 deaths
14th-century Italian historians
14th-century Italian politicians
Ambassadors of the Republic of Florence
14th-century people of the Republic of Florence
People from Florence